Sir William Coddington, 1st Baronet (1830 – 15 February 1918) was an English cotton manufacturer and Conservative politician who sat in the House of Commons from 1880 to 1906.

Biography 
Coddington was born at Salford, Lancashire, the eldest son of William Dudley Coddington, a Manchester merchant, and his wife Elizabeth Hopwood. 

In 1842 his father settled in Blackburn as a cotton spinner and manufacturer. Coddington was a business man, and when his father died in 1867, he was left the management of the mills. Under his supervision the firm flourished, and he was able to take full advantage of the trade boom which followed the cotton famine. He erected two mills, Ordnance and Wellington New Mills.

In 1875, he was Mayor of Blackburn and in that year, he presented an organ to the Parish Church at a cost of £3,000. He was elected as Member of Parliament (MP) for Blackburn at the 1880 general election. He held the seat until his retirement in 1906. In Parliament Sir William was remembered for his work as chairman of the Parliamentary Committee for widening the streets of London. He became a baronet in 1896. 

In 1912, his services to the town of Blackburn were recognised by presenting him with the Freedom of the Borough.

In 1864 he married Sarah Catherine, daughter of William Thomas Hall, of Wakefield, and they had one daughter. They lived firstly at Spring Mount and later at Wycollar, which had been built by his father.

Personal life and death 
Sir William married again in his 83rd year, his second wife being Aimee Josephine Barber-Starkie. He died at Wycollar in his 87th year.

References

Oxford Dictionary of National Biography J. Geoffrey Timmins, Coddington, Sir William, baronet (1830–1918), first published Sept 2004

External links 
 

1830 births
1918 deaths
Baronets in the Baronetage of the United Kingdom
Conservative Party (UK) MPs for English constituencies
UK MPs 1880–1885
UK MPs 1885–1886
UK MPs 1886–1892
UK MPs 1892–1895
UK MPs 1895–1900
UK MPs 1900–1906
People from Salford
Mayors of places in Lancashire
Politics of Blackburn with Darwen
British textile industry businesspeople